Aladau (Belarusian: Аладаў) is a Belarusian masculine surname, its feminine counterpart is Aladava (Аладава). In Russia, this surname is transliterated as Aladaov (Аладов, masculine) and Aladova (Аладова, feminine). The surname may refer to the following notable people: 
Alena Aladava (1907–1986), Belarusian art historian 
Nikolay Aladov (1890–1972), Belarusian composer, husband of Alena
Ninel Aladova (born 1934), Belarusian architect

Belarusian-language surnames